Radio Fargo-Moorhead (RFM) is a radio broadcasting company based Fargo, North Dakota.  The firm has had two iterations, each centered on James Ingstad.

2007–2013
RFM was formed in September 2006, when James Ingstad bought six radio stations from Clear Channel Communications. That group sale was approved by the Federal Communications Commission (FCC) on January 19, 2007. During this period, RFM studios and offices are located at 1020 S. 25th Street in Fargo.  The six station cluster consisted of:

 KVOX 740 - "740 The Fan" (sports)
 KFGO AM 790 - "The Mighty 790 KFGO" (news/talk)
 WDAY-FM 93.7 - "Y94" (CHR/top 40)
 KBVB FM 95.1 - "Bob 95 FM" (country)
 KRWK FM 101.9 - "101.9 Talk FM" (news/talk)
 KMJO FM 104.7 - "104.7 Popster FM" (contemporary adult hits)

2013 Fargo radio realignment
On September 18, 2012, The Forum of Fargo-Moorhead reported that Radio Fargo-Moorhead, Inc. had announced on its website a deal to sell all the stations in the cluster to Midwest Communications of Wausau, Wisconsin. The sale was approved by the FCC and finalized on 1 May 2013. Within hours of the sale, Radio Fargo-Moorhead owner purchased the cross-town rival cluster owned by Triad Broadcasting (KVOX-FM, KLTA, KPFX, KQWB-FM, KQWB-AM, and KBMW) in a deal that allowed him to take immediate control of the stations via a Local Marketing Agreement while the full sale awaited FCC approval. In a third deal, Ingstad arranged to swap KVOX-FM with his former Country outlet KBVB, and its morning show "Chris, John and Jane".  The new Radio Fargo-Moorhead group identifies themselves as "Radio FM Media" and includes:

KBVB 95.1 "BOB95" (country)
KLTA 98.7 "Big 98-7" (Hot AC)
KPFX 107.9 "107.9 The Fox" (Classic rock)
KQWB-AM 1660 "Bison 1660" (Sports)
KQWB-FM 105.1 "Q105.1" (Active rock)

In September 2013, Radio FM Media started operating KZDR-FM "92.7 The Drive" Under a Local Marketing Agreement. The station is owned by an Ingstad family member who identifies the company as "Mediactive LLC".

Effective June 1, 2016, Radio FM Media sold KBMW to Radio Wahpeton Breckenridge, LLC for $300,000. The purchaser is owned by James Ingstad's daughter Brooke.

References

External links
 Radio FM Media

 
Radio broadcasting companies of the United States
Companies based in North Dakota